Banff-Kananaskis is a provincial electoral district in Alberta, Canada. The district is one of 87 districts mandated to return a single member (MLA) to the Legislative Assembly of Alberta using the first past the post method of voting. It was contested for the first time in the 2019 Alberta election.

Geography
The district is located in Alberta's Rocky Mountains and the adjacent foothills west of Calgary. Its largest communities are Banff and Canmore, and it contains the entirety of Banff National Park and Kananaskis Country, for which it is named. Stretching east to Calgary's border, some farming communities are also included, as well as the Treaty 7 communities of the Tsuu T'ina Nation and the Îyârhe Nakoda's Stoney Reserves.

History

The district was created in 2017 when the Electoral Boundaries Commission recommended moving the city of Cochrane to the new riding of Airdrie-Cochrane, requiring a new name for Banff-Cochrane. The district gained small areas to the south and west from Airdrie, Chestermere-Rocky View and Livingstone-Macleod, including the entirety of Kananaskis Country. The Commission also decided to join the Stoney Reserves and Tsuu T'ina Reserve into the same district for representation purposes. In 2017, the Banff-Kananaskis electoral district had a population of 46,824, which was slightly above the provincial average of 46,803 for a provincial electoral district.

In the 2019 Alberta general election, United Conservative Party candidate Miranda Rosin was elected with 51 per cent of the vote, defeating New Democratic Party incumbent candidate Cam Westhead with 42 per cent of the vote, and four other candidates.

Electoral results

2010s

References

Alberta provincial electoral districts
Banff, Alberta
Canmore, Alberta